Lucien Loizeau (9 April 1879 – 6 June 1978) was a French general who was known for his writings on military topics. Commander of the French 6th Army Corps at the beginning of World War II, he was taken prisoner by the Germans in 1940 and was held for the remainder of the war at the German POW camp at Königstein Fortress. He was awarded the Grand Cross of the Legion of Honour in 1950.

References

1879 births
1978 deaths
Military personnel from Reims
French generals
French military personnel of World War II
Grand Croix of the Légion d'honneur
Knights of the Order of Orange-Nassau
Grand Officers of the Order of the Star of Romania
Commanders with Star of the Order of Polonia Restituta
Commander's Grand Crosses of the Order of the Lithuanian Grand Duke Gediminas
Grand Commanders of the Order of the Phoenix (Greece)
École Spéciale Militaire de Saint-Cyr alumni